Global Engine Alliance LLC, began as a joint venture of Chrysler, Mitsubishi Motors, and Hyundai Motor Company for developing a line of shared engines.

In September 2009, Chrysler purchased Mitsubishi and Hyundai's shares, after 5 years of allied research and development, making its Dundee, Michigan plant a wholly owned subsidiary of what was then Chrysler Group LLC.

Global Engine Manufacturing Alliance 
Global Engine Manufacturing Alliance, LLC (GEMA) was the manufacturing arm of the Global Engine Alliance and consisted of five factories worldwide. Production began in 2005, with an annual capacity of approximately two million engines; each plant was capable of producing 420,000. Twenty different automobile models from the three companies were to use the engines. Chrysler had expected to use GEMA engines in ten models and projects, and buy up to 840,000 GEMA engines annually.

The Dundee plants were purchased by Chrysler in December, 2012, and renamed the Chrysler Dundee Engine Plant(s).  After Chrysler's assimilation into FCA, the plant simply became known as the Dundee Engine Plant.

Design
Hyundai was initially responsible for leading the design of the base engine, while the Chrysler Group and Mitsubishi were involved in making other important engineering contributions pertaining to the design. The design features Siamese bores, an aluminium block with cast-iron cylinder liners, and an aluminium head. Different cylinder liners could be fitted to increase or decrease displacement depending on manufacturers needs. Each manufacturer configured their variants of the initial design differently based on their engineering needs and standards, so consumers may experience very different power, fuel efficiency, and "feel" from each manufacturer.

See also
Chrysler World engine - Chrysler's GEMA built engines
Mitsubishi 4B1 engine - Mitsubishi's GEMA built engines
Hyundai Theta engine - Hyundai's GEMA built engines

References

External links
Official site

Mercedes-Benz Group
Hyundai Motor Company
Joint ventures
Chrysler
Mitsubishi Motors
Companies based in Michigan